Mali i Kulmakut is a peak in the southeastern part of the Tomorr range in Albania.

References

Mountains of Albania